Holomorph may refer to:

Mathematics
 Holomorph (mathematics), a group which simultaneously contains (copies of) a group and its automorphism group
 Holomorphic functions, the central object of study of complex analysis

Biology
 Teleomorph, anamorph and holomorph, applying to portions of the life cycles of fungi in the phyla Ascomycota and Basidiomycota